Tveter is a Norwegian surname that may refer to

Alexander Ruud Tveter (born 1991), Norwegian football forward 
Annette Tveter (born 1974), Norwegian handball player 
Bjørn Tveter (born 1944), Norwegian speed skater 
Finn Tveter (born 1947), Norwegian jurist and Olympic rower 
Inger-Johanne Tveter, Norwegian handball player
Kåre Tveter (1922–2012), Norwegian painter and illustrator 
Øyvind Tveter (born 1954), Norwegian speed skater, brother of Bjørn

Norwegian-language surnames